Goodbye to Yesterday may refer to:

"Goodbye to Yesterday" (No Angels song), 2007
"Goodbye to Yesterday" (Elina Born & Stig Rästa song), 2015